William Rigby (4 September 1906 – 1977) was an English footballer who played as a winger for Wigan Borough, Stockport County and Rochdale. He also played non-league football for various other clubs, including the newly formed Peterborough United, where he had the distinction of being the first ever scorer for the club.

References 

English footballers
Bolton Wanderers F.C. players
Atherton F.C. players
Clitheroe F.C. players
Wigan Borough F.C. players
Stockport County F.C. players
Rochdale A.F.C. players
Peterborough United F.C. players
Glentoran F.C. players
Derry City F.C. players
1906 births
1977 deaths